Svetlana Nikolaevna Kryuchkova (born 22 June 1950) is a Soviet and Russian actress.

Kryuchkova was born in Kishinev, Moldavian SSR (now Chişinău, Moldova). From 1975 to 1989, she was married to Yuri Veksler. She married Aleksandr Molodtsov in 1990. She has one child from each marriage.

Selected filmography

Film

TV

Awards and nominations
 Honored Artist of the RSFSR (1983)
 People's Artist of the RSFSR (1991)
Golden Eagle Award for Best Actress in Pokhoronite menya za plintusom — nominated (2010)
 Winner of two Nika Awards (1990, 2010)
 Stanislavsky Award (2020)

References

External links 

1950 births
Living people
Actors from Chișinău
Russian film actresses
Russian television actresses
Soviet film actresses
Soviet television actresses
Recipients of the Nika Award
People's Artists of the RSFSR
Moscow Art Theatre School alumni
20th-century Russian actresses
21st-century Russian actresses